Gasperina is a town and comune in the province of Catanzaro, in the Calabria region of southern Italy.

Gasperina is also the birthplace of internationally collected figurative artist Antonio Diego Voci, 1920–1985.

Cities and towns in Calabria